Cassatt & Company was a Philadelphia based investment banking and brokerage firm founded in 1872. The firm was acquired by Merrill Lynch in 1940, shortly after Merrill's merger with E.A. Pierce & Co. that created Merrill Lynch, E.A. Pierce & Cassatt.

The Cassatt name was dropped in 1940 when the newly combined firm acquired New Orleans-based Fenner & Beane.

History

Founding and early history
The firm, which was originally known as Lloyd, Cassatt & Company was founded by Robert S. Cassatt, father of railroad executive Alexander Cassatt.

By 1919, the firm had offices in Philadelphia, New York, Pittsburgh and Baltimore.

Acquisition by Merrill Lynch and E.A. Pierce

In 1931, the firm split its investment banking business from its traditional brokerage business.

In 1934, Cassatt began discussions with E.A. Pierce & Co., the largest brokerage firm in the U.S. at the time about a potential merger.  In 1935, these discussions resulted in a partnership between the two firms.  As part of the deal, Cassatt transferred its brokerage business to E.A. Pierce and focused exclusively on investment banking and merchant banking.

In the late 1930s, E.A. Pierce began discussions with Merrill Lynch about a potential merger.  E.A. Pierce was struggling financially in the 1930s and was thinly capitalized.  Following the death of Edmund C. Lynch in 1938, Winthrop Smith began discussions with Charles E. Merrill, who owned a minority interest in E.A. Pierce about a possible merger of the two firms.  On April 1, 1940, Merrill Lynch, E.A. Pierce & Cassatt was formed when the two firms merged and also acquired Cassatt & Co.

References

"Cassatt & Company".  Moody's Magazine, Volume 17. 1914
"Cassatt & Company, Bankers and Brokers".  The Banker's Magazine, Volume 73. 1906
"Alexander J. Cassatt".  The Railway Age, Volume 43, 1907

Merrill (company)
Former investment banks of the United States
Financial services companies established in 1872
Financial services companies disestablished in 1940
1940 mergers and acquisitions
Defunct financial services companies of the United States
Companies based in Philadelphia
1872 establishments in Pennsylvania
1940 disestablishments in Pennsylvania